Pandji Pragiwaksono Wongsoyudo (born 18 June 1979 in Singapore) is an Indonesian stand-up comedian, actor, radio broadcaster, television presenter, book writer, and rap singer,

Early life and education 
Pandji was born in Singapore, and attended SMP Negeri 29 Jakarta (Jakarta 29 Public Junior High School). He is also an alumnus of Kolese Gonzaga, Jakarta.

He studied product design at the Design Department, Faculty of Fine Arts and ITB in 1997.

Career 
He began his career as a radio broadcaster at Hard Rock FM Bandung with Tike Priatnakusumah for two years until 2003, before moving to Jakarta and becoming a Hard Rock broadcaster in Jakarta for three years, and was known for his collaboration with Steny Agustaf.

He also presented the reality show Kena Deh on Trans 7, originally aired on Antv in 2008. He also hosted movie review Kok Bisa? and broadcast programs on NBA matches on Jak TV, because of his interest in basketball.

Kolam Komik 
Pandji is an illustrator and writer at KolamKomik.com which is a comic publisher that he owns with Shani Budi Pandita. The comic, Degalings is published every Wednesday.
A special edition titled "H2O" was released in September 2011 at Plaza Indonesia.

Music 
In 2008, he released his first rap album entitled Provocative Proactive, which featured the artists Tompi, Steny Agustaf and his own wife, Gamila Arief.

In 2009, he also released his second album, You'll Never Know When Someone Comes in and Press Play On Your Paused Life.

On 21 January 2010, Pandji contributed his voice to the album This is Me, which is a charity album. The proceeds from the sales of the album were given to the Indonesian Child Oncology Foundation.

He has appeared on several music shows such as Soulnation.

His 2010 album, Merdesa, reaped a big advantage by implementing a free lunch method recognized by Hermawan Kertajaya.

On 21 May 2012, launched his 4th hip hop album, Album 32 to coincide with the 14th anniversary of Soeharto's downfall. Songs such as "Demokrasi Kita" and "Indonesia Free" contain speeches from Mohammad Hatta. Album 32 also features songs such as "GR" featuring Abenk Ranadireksa (Soulvibe), and "For Sahabatku" featuring Davinaraja (the Extralarge) which he wrote for his fans.

Stand-up comedy 
He started his career as a comedian in 2010, beginning with the Twivate Concert Pertama in April.

On 28 December 2011, he produced his own comedy show at the Usmar Ismail Theater, Bhinneka Tunggal Tawa. He appeared in two shows opening for comedians Ernest Prakasa, Sam D. Putra and Luqman Baihaqi.

He was also the originator of the idea of a competition Stand Up Comedy Indonesia (SUCI) on Kompas TV. After Kompas TV found his comedy videos on YouTube, Kompas TV invited him to be the host of the competition.

On 8 December, he held a special performance under the name INDONESIA: (read: Indonesia colon), a combination of hip hop concerts, stand-up comedy, the launch of the book Berani Mengubah, and the launch of his fourth album, Album 32.

He started as a world tour in 2018 which originally began in Manila, taking in 13 cities, and including China, the Netherlands and (Germany).

Politics 
In 2016, he became the speaker for Anies Baswedan's campaign team for the 2017 Jakarta gubernatorial election.

Discography 
 Provocative Proactive (2008)
 You'll Never Know When Someone Comes in and Press Play On Your Paused Life (2009)
 Merdesa (2010)
 Album 32 (2012)
 Pemanasan (2015)

Filmography 
 Make Money (2013) as Aris
 Comic 8 (2014)
 Marmut Merah Jambu (2014) as Guru 1 SMA
 Dibalik 98 (2015) as Susilo Bambang Yudhoyono
 Youtubers (2015)
 Comic 8: Casino Kings part 1 (2015)
 Single (2015) as Wawan
 Comic 8: Casino Kings part 2 (2016)
 Rudy Habibie (2016) as Peter Manumasa
 Stip & Pensil (2017) as Pak Adam
 Insya Allah Sah (2017) as Raka
 The Underdogs (2017) as Presenter Talkshow
 Ayat-Ayat Cinta 2 (2017) as Hulusi
 Partikelir (2018) as Adri
 Insya Allah Sah 2 (2018) as Raka
 DOA - Doyok Otoy Ali Oncom: Cari Jodoh as Otoy

Bibliography 
 Nasional.Is.Me
 How I Sold 1000 CDs in 30 Days
 Menghargai Gratisan
 Merdeka Dalam Bercanda
 Berani Mengubah
 Indiepreneur
 Menemukan Indonesia
 Juru Bicara

References

External links 
 
 
 

Living people
1979 births
21st-century Indonesian male actors
Indonesian bloggers
Indonesian film directors
People of Javanese descent
Indonesian rappers
Indonesian writers
Indonesian radio presenters
Indonesian comics artists
Indonesian male comedians
Indonesian comedians
Male bloggers